Harry Rees (birth unknown – death unknown) was a Welsh professional rugby league footballer who played in the 1920s.

Playing career

International honours
Harry Rees won caps for Wales while at Batley in 1923, and in 1925.

Championship final appearances
Harry Rees played left-, i.e. number 4, in Batley's 13–7 victory over Wigan in the 1923–24 Championship Final during the 1923–24 season, at The Cliff, Broughton, Salford on Saturday 3 May 1924, in front of a crowd of 13,729.

County Cup Final appearances
Harry Rees played right-, i.e. number 3, in Batley's 0–5 defeat by York in the 1922–23 Yorkshire County Cup Final during the 1922–23 season at Headingley Rugby Stadium, Leeds on Saturday 2 December 1922, in front of a crowd of 33,719, and played left-, i.e. number 4, in the 8–9 defeat by Wakefield Trinity in the 1924–25 Yorkshire County Cup Final during the 1924–25 season at Headingley Rugby Stadium, Leeds on Saturday 22 November 1924, in front of a crowd of 25,546.

Note
"The British Rugby League Records Book" has separate entries for H. R. Davies, and Harry Rees. Other sources combine these entries. However, it is not known whether this persons' full name is actually Harry Rees Davies.

References

External links

Batley Bulldogs players
Place of birth missing
Place of death missing
Rugby league centres
Wales national rugby league team players
Welsh rugby league players
Year of birth missing
Year of death missing